The Chalice of Doña Urraca is a jewel-encrusted onyx chalice kept at the Basilica of San Isidoro in León, Spain, which belonged to infanta Urraca of Zamora, daughter of Ferdinand I of Leon.

In March 2014, Spanish authors Margarita Torres and José Ortega del Rio asserted the chalice could be the purported Holy Grail (a claim that had never been made during the roughly one thousand years the chalice had been kept in the Basilica). Although the claim was met with disbelief by historians and specialists, who claim the materials and techniques used in the chalice indicate a mid-11th century origin, the allegations led to unprecedented crowds swarming to the Basilica to see it, which led to the setting aside of a separate exhibition room only for the chalice.

Location
The chalice is kept at the Basilica of San Isidoro in León, Spain, where historians say it has been since the 11th century.

The publication of The Kings of the Grail in March 2014, which claims the chalice is the Holy Grail, led museum staff at the basilica to swiftly withdraw the chalice from display, saying the crowds seeking to visit the museum were too large for it to handle. The museum now displays the chalice in a separate room in the tower alongside the old library.

History and Holy Grail claims

Authors and researchers Margarita Torres and José Ortega del Rio published their book, The Kings of the Grail, in March 2014 claiming they had traced the origins of the chalice to the early Christian communities of Jerusalem.

The researchers say the chalice was transported to Cairo by Muslim travelers and was later given to an emir on the Spanish coast who had assisted victims of a famine in Egypt. From there, the chalice came into the possession of King Ferdinand I of Leon, father of Urraca of Zamora, as a peace offering by an Andalusian ruler.

Dating suggests the chalice was made between 200 BC and 100 AD. According to Torres, "the only chalice that could be considered the chalice of Christ is that which made the journey to Cairo and then from Cairo to León — and that is this chalice".

Archaeologists quickly sought to dispel Torres and del Rio's claims, pointing out that an estimated 200 different cups and chalices across Europe "vie for the title". Diarmaid MacCulloch, Professor of the History of the Church at Oxford University, said the claims were "idiotic". The authors expressed uncertainty about whether Jesus actually used the cup.

To make the chalice more accessible, in 2017 it was digitalized, modeled in 3D and made available for watching it wearing VR glasses. Visitor to the museum can have the experience of having the virtual chalice in their hands and analyzing all its details.

References

External links
Museo San Isidoro de Leon

Holy Grail
León, Spain